Francis Ernest Dossetor (16 December 1885 – 8 November 1950) was an Australian rules footballer who played with the Melbourne University Football Club. He was also listed with the Melbourne Football Club, but never played a game.

References

Sources
Holmesby, Russell & Main, Jim (2007). The Encyclopedia of AFL Footballers. 7th ed. Melbourne: Bas Publishing.

1885 births
1950 deaths
Australian rules footballers from Victoria (Australia)
University Football Club players
People educated at Melbourne Grammar School